Ba-wan is a Taiwanese street food, consisting of a  diameter disk-shaped translucent dough made of sweet potato starch filled with a savory stuffing and served with a sweet and savory sauce. The stuffing varies widely according to different regions in Taiwan, but usually consists of a mixture of pork, bamboo shoots, and shiitake mushrooms. Changhua-style ba-wan is considered to be the "standard" ba-wan as it is the most famous and most widely imitated of all styles of ba-wan.

The term "ba-wan" is a non-standard romanization derived from Taiwanese Hokkien. In the township of Lukang, Changhua County, ba-wan are known as  because they take on the block-like shape of the character 回.

The gelatinous dough is made of a combination of corn starch, sweet potato starch, and rice flour, which gives it its chewy, sticky, and gelatinous texture (sometimes described as "Q" in Taiwanese parlance) and a greyish translucent hue. Ba-wan are initially cooked by steaming; however, they may also be served after being deep fried to give them a "skin" or gently poached in oil to heat them without drying them out.

History
It is believed that ba-wan were first prepared in the Beidou township of Changhua County by a scribe by the name of Fan Wan-chu as food for disaster relief, when the region was struck by heavy floods in 1898. Since then, ba-wan has spread to different regions of Taiwan and is now considered by many as a national food, and can be found in most night markets in Taiwan.  Their form makes them relatively easy to pre-make and store. Like potstickers or steamed buns, they can be quickly heated again in oil before serving.

See also
 Cepelinai
 List of dumplings
 Taiwanese cuisine

References

Taiwanese cuisine
Dumplings